Plant City Airport  is a public-use airport located two nautical miles (4 km) southwest of the central business district of Plant City in Hillsborough County, Florida, United States. The airport is publicly owned by the Hillsborough County Aviation Authority, which also operates Tampa International Airport. It was formerly known as Plant City Municipal Airport.  It supports a  industrial park located about one mile (1.6 km) east of the airport.

Although most U.S. airports use the same three-letter location identifier for the FAA and IATA, this airport is assigned PCM by the FAA but PCM stands for a Mexican airport.

History 
Plant City was originally a large cotton center but switched to strawberries which brought it national recognition. It was named for the city's well known railroad tycoon, Henry B. Plant.

The Plant City Municipal Airport was founded in 1948 to ship strawberries. Runway 09/27 was lengthened in 1999 and redesignated 10/28.  In 2000, a new terminal was constructed, along with two new hangars (E and F) and a new Jet-A fuel tank.

Facilities and aircraft 
It has one asphalt paved runway designated 10/28 which measures 3,950 x 75 ft (1,204 x 23 m). For the 12-month period ending May 9, 2002, the airport had 47,975 aircraft operations, an average of 131 per day:
99.5% general aviation, 0.4% air taxi and <0.1% military. At that time there were 72 aircraft based at this airport: 83% single-engine, 13% multi-engine and 4% helicopter. The local fixed-base operator is Atlas Aviation.

See also
 List of airports in the Tampa Bay area
 List of airports in Florida

References

External links
 Plant City Airport Services
 Plant City Airport page from Hillsborough County Aviation Authority

Airports in the Tampa Bay area
Transportation buildings and structures in Hillsborough County, Florida
1948 establishments in Florida
Airports established in 1948
Plant City, Florida